= Providing Assistance for Girls Advancement in Technical Education Initiative =

Indian government scheme

Providing Assistance for Girls Advancement in Technical Education Initiative or PRAGATI is an AICTE, Ministry of Human Resource Development, Government of India scheme that envisions selection of one girl per family having income is less than 6 lakhs per annum to pursue technical education.

The scholarship amount under the scheme is Rs 30,000 or tuition fees and Rs 2000 per month for contingency allowance for 10 months.
